Edineț was a county of Moldova from 1998 to 2003. Its population in 2003 was 279,100. Its capital was Edineț.

It was bordered by Romania and Ukraine, and with the Moldovan counties of Bălți and Soroca.

It had 165 localities, 8 of which had urban status: Briceni, Cupcini, Dondușeni, Edineț, Frunză, Lipcani, Ocnița, and Otaci.

External links
 Counties of Moldova, Statoids.com

Counties of Moldova
Counties of Bessarabia
1998 establishments in Moldova
2003 disestablishments in Moldova
States and territories established in 1998
States and territories disestablished in 2003